GURPS Conan is a sourcebook and a series of solo adventures for GURPS.

Publication history

GURPS Conan was one of the earliest products from a licensed property produced by Steve Jackson Games. The company, after launching GURPS in 1986, acquired a Conan game license from Conan Properties International in 1988. The same year, Steve Jackson Games published a solo adventure titled GURPS Conan: Beyond Thunder River. Only the following year, in 1989, saw light of day the GURPS Conan setting supplement: GURPS Conan, The World of Robert E. Howard's Barbarian Hero. The core rulebook was written by Curtis M. Scott, with a cover by Kirk Reinert and illustrations by Butch Burcham, and was published by Steve Jackson Games as a 128-page book. Three other solo adventures followed this setting supplement, all of them also in 1989: GURPS Conan and the Queen of the Black Coast, GURPS Conan: Moon of Blood and GURPS Conan the Wyrmslayer.

Timeline releases:

 GURPS Conan: Beyond Thunder River (1988, a solo adventure, based on the story Beyond the Black River)
 GURPS Conan (1989, the supplement setting for GURPS)
 GURPS Conan and the Queen of the Black Coast (1989, a solo adventure, based on the story Queen of the Black Coast)
 GURPS Conan: Moon of Blood (1989, a solo adventure, based on the story of the same name)
 GURPS Conan the Wyrmslayer (1989, a solo adventure, based on the story The Lair of the Ice Worm)

Contents (supplement setting)
GURPS Conan is a GURPS campaign setting supplement describing how to use fantasy role-playing in the Hyborian Age, including rules for character creation and running a campaign, and an introduction written by L. Sprague de Camp.

Reception
In the September–October 1989 edition of Games International (Issue #9), Mike Jarvis admired the production quality of the book, calling the cover art "a nicely rendered painting showing everyone's favourite barabrian." Jarvis pointed out that "GURPS fantasy campaigns tend to be a little lacking in interesting sword fodder", so he found the seven pages of new monsters "a rare treat indeed! [...] a joy for any fantasy referee. This section would almost warrant the book's purchase." Although Jarvis found the chapter on religions "functional but uninspired", he enjoyed the gazetteer, saying, "It is here that the book really comes into its own. Each country is covered in a detail which I found surprising for such a book." However, Jarvis thought the lack of a scenario to be a detriment. He concluded by giving the book an above-average rating of 4 stars out of 5, saying, "Overall this is a most accomplished work, suitable for anyone who wants a world for the GURPS fantasy campaign, whether they're Conan fans or not. My only reservations are the reliance on [the previously published] GURPS Magic and the lack of a complete referee scenario."

See also
 Conan Unchained!
 Conan Against Darkness!
 Conan Role-Playing Game
 Conan: The Roleplaying Game
 Conan: Adventures in an Age Undreamed Of

References

Fantasy role-playing games
Conan
Role-playing games based on Conan the Barbarian
Role-playing game supplements introduced in 1989